William Elijah Funn (born March 13, 1982) is an American former professional basketball player. In 2005, he led the NCAA Division I in assists per game, with 8.0, and helped Portland State win the Big Sky Conference championship. Funn then played in the American Basketball Association and was named an All-Star in 2006 and 2007.

See also
List of NCAA Division I men's basketball season assists leaders

References

1982 births
Living people
American expatriate basketball people in Canada
American expatriate basketball people in the Dominican Republic
American expatriate basketball people in Mexico
American expatriate basketball people in Romania
American expatriate basketball people in Ukraine
American expatriate basketball people in Venezuela
American men's basketball players
Basketball players from California
BC Politekhnika-Halychyna players
Bucaneros de Campeche players
Bucaneros de La Guaira players
CSU Sibiu players
Frayles de Guasave players
Halifax Rainmen players
Junior college men's basketball players in the United States
Lechugueros de León players
Pioneros de Los Mochis players
Point guards
Portland State Vikings men's basketball players
Worcester Wolves players
Place of birth missing (living people)